The Booker T. Washington National Monument is a National Monument near the community of Hardy, Virginia, and is located entirely in rural Franklin County, Virginia.  It preserves portions of the 207-acre (0.90 km2) tobacco farm on which educator and leader Booker T. Washington was born into slavery on April 5, 1856.  It provides interpretation of Washington's life and achievements, as well as interpretation of 1850s slavery and farming through the use of buildings, gardens, crafts and animals.

Congress authorized the Booker T. Washington Memorial half dollar to fund the purchase of the site. This commemorative half dollar was the first US coin to feature an African American, and was minted from 1946 to 1951 at three different mints. 18 varieties of the coin were produced, and more than 1.5 million were sold (primarily to collectors). Yet, after the coin's production was finished, the BTW Commission owed more money than it had assets, and the Commonwealth of Virginia had to step in to provide funds to purchase the site.

The site was listed on the National Register of Historic Places in 1966 and designated a National Monument on April 2, 1956.

See also
Tuskegee University
List of national monuments of the United States

References

External links

 Booker T. Washington National Monument
 Booker T. Washington Slave Cabin Commemorative Coin

National Park Service National Monuments in Virginia
Museums established in 1956
Museums in Franklin County, Virginia
African-American museums in Virginia
Washington, Booker T. National Monument
Farm museums in Virginia
Protected areas of Franklin County, Virginia
Protected areas established in 1956
National Register of Historic Places in Franklin County, Virginia
Cultural depictions of Booker T. Washington
Statues of activists
Statues of politicians
Historic districts on the National Register of Historic Places in Virginia
Slave cabins and quarters in the United States